Morax is a surname. Notable people with the surname include:

Jean Morax (1869–1939), Swiss painter, theater decorator, and draftsman
René Morax, Swiss poet and playwright (1873–1963), author of Le Roi David
Victor Morax (1866–1935), French ophthalmologist
Morax, also known as Zhongli, a playable character in game Genshin Impact